Denta (Banat Bulgarian: Dénta) is a commune in Timiș County, Romania. It is composed of four villages: Breștea, Denta (commune seat), Rovinița Mare and Rovinița Mică.

Geography 
Denta is located in the southwest of Timiș County, about 40 km south from Timișoara and 5 km south from Deta, the nearest town. It is crossed by the Bârzava River, canalized from Denta to Serbia.

History 

Denta was first mentioned in 1322 (Dench), when it belonged to Krassó County. The settlement is however much older. It is assumed that between Deta and Denta there was the Roman castrum of Potula, through which passed the Roman road connecting Canonia (Vršac) to Zurobara (probably Timișoara). Several Roman vestiges were discovered here, including a border stone. Béla IV of Hungary would have built a fortress here in 1241. Thus, after the retreat of the Tatars, there were several fortresses in the area, including Denta. In the 16th century, when Banat was a Turkish eyalet, Denta was an Ottoman fortress that belonged to the Eyalet of Temeşvar. The plague epidemics of the 17th century also affected Denta. Turkish scholar Evliya Çelebi recalls the Denta Fortress in 1660. He says that it is "placed on the bank of Timiș River with reinforcements in four corners. The fortress is guarded by a captain with 50 soldiers. It has a military depot, a mosque, a restaurant and a few small shops" and that "there are many fruitful gardens in the fortress". The Ottoman rule ends in 1716, when Prince Eugene of Savoy enters Timișoara. Consequently the Turkish troops withdraw from the Denta Fortress, which thus comes under the rule of the Austrian Empire. At that time, Denta had about 100 houses. In 1720, the first colonizations with Germans began. In order to ensure their religious service, the Roman Catholic parish was established in 1724. Thus, until the outbreak of the Austro-Turkish War of 1737, 37 German families lived in Denta. In 1745 the first Bulgarian families moved here. In the same year, the construction of the Bârzava Canal begins. On 15 February 1796, Denta received the right to hold weekly fairs.

Breștea was founded in 1842 by around 110 families of Roman Catholic Banat Bulgarians from Dudeștii Vechi. Each head of household received a lot of house and 11 jugers of arable land. After 1880 part of the Bulgarian population returned to Bulgaria, where they founded the village of Bardarski Geran. The Bulgarians built a Roman Catholic church in 1902 and an oratory around the same year.

The first recorded mention of Rovinița Mare dates from 1288, under the name Humur. The census of 1717 recorded it with 60 houses and as part of the district of Ciacova. Rovinița Mare became the property of the Austrian Aerarium, and in 1779 German settlers were brought here. At the same time, rice cultivation begins in the village. Later, Hungarian settlers are brought here. Towards the end of the 19th century, they outnumbered the Romanians, while the Germans remained a smaller community. South of Rovinița Mare, 80 families of German settlers founded Rovinița Mică in 1895. The land was made available to them by the Aerarium. The villages were originally known as Omor and Omoru Mic, the Romanianized versions of the Hungarian Omor and Kisomor, respectively. These names were changed by Decree no. 799/1964, since the communist authorities deemed them strange (in Romanian, omor means "murder").

Demographics 

Denta had a population of 2,982 inhabitants at the 2011 census, down 6% from the 2002 census. Most inhabitants are Romanians (63.21%), larger minorities being represented by Bulgarians (16.06%), Hungarians (8.62%), Serbs (4.26%), Roma (2.38%) and Germans (1.01%). For 3.49% of the population, ethnicity is unknown. By religion, most inhabitants are Orthodox (60.97%), but there are also minorities of Roman Catholics (27.03%), Serbian Orthodox (3.59%), Pentecostals (3.15%) and Baptists (1.17%). For 3.49% of the population, religious affiliation is unknown.

References 

Communes in Timiș County
Localities in Romanian Banat
Bulgarian communities in Romania